This listing contains taxa of plants in the division Pinophyta, recorded from South Africa. Also known as Coniferophyta or Coniferae, or commonly as conifers, Pinophyta are a division of vascular land plants containing a single extant class, Pinopsida. They are cone-bearing seed plants, a subset of gymnosperms. All extant conifers are perennial woody plants with secondary growth. The great majority are trees, though a few are shrubs. As of 1998, the division Pinophyta was estimated to contain eight families, 68 genera, and 629 living species.

Although the total number of species is relatively small, conifers are  ecologically important. They are the dominant plants over large areas of land, most notably the taiga of the Northern Hemisphere, but also in similar cool climates in mountains further south. While tropical rainforests have more biodiversity and turnover, the immense conifer forests of the world represent the largest terrestrial carbon sink.

23,420 species of vascular plant have been recorded in South Africa, making it the sixth most species-rich country in the world and the most species-rich country on the African continent. Of these, 153 species are considered to be threatened. Nine biomes have been described in South Africa: Fynbos, Succulent Karoo, desert, Nama Karoo, grassland, savanna, Albany thickets, the Indian Ocean coastal belt, and forests.

The 2018 South African National Biodiversity Institute's National Biodiversity Assessment plant checklist lists 35,130 taxa in the phyla Anthocerotophyta (hornworts (6)), Anthophyta (flowering plants(33534)), Bryophyta (mosses (685)), Cycadophyta (cycads (42)), Lycopodiophyta (Lycophytes(45)), Marchantiophyta (liverworts (376)), Pinophyta (conifers (32)), and Pteridophyta {cryptograms(408)).

Listing
Cryptomeria japonica (L.f.) D.Don
Cupressus arizonica Greene var. arizonica
Cupressus arizonica Greene var. glabra (Sudw.) Little	
Cupressus arizonica Greene var. montana (Wiggins) Little	
Cupressus lusitanica Mill. var. lusitanica	
Cupressus sempervirens L. var. sempervirens	
Juniperus bermudiana L.	
Juniperus pinchotii Sudw.	
Juniperus virginiana L.	
Pinus canariensis C.Sm. ex DC.	
Pinus coulteri D.Don	
Pinus elliottii Engelm.	
Pinus elliottii Engelm. var. elliottii	
Pinus halepensis Mill.	
Pinus halepensis Mill. var. halepensis	
Pinus patula Schltdl. & Cham.	
Pinus patula Schltdl. & Cham. var. patula	
Pinus pinaster Aiton	
Pinus pinea L.	
Pinus radiata D.Don	
Pinus roxburghii Sarg.	
Pinus taeda L.	
Podocarpus elongatus (Aiton) L'Her. ex Pers. Endemic
Podocarpus falcatus (Thunb.) R.Br. ex Mirb. Indigenous
Podocarpus henkelii Stapf ex Dallim. & A.B.Jacks. Endemic
Podocarpus latifolius (Thunb.) R.Br. ex Mirb. Indigenous
Taxodium distichum (L.) Rich. var. distichum
Widdringtonia cedarbergensis J.A.Marsh nom. superfl. Endemic
Widdringtonia nodiflora (L.) Powrie, Indigenous
Widdringtonia nodiflora (L.) Powrie var. dracomontana (Stapf) Silba, Indigenous
Widdringtonia schwarzii (Marloth) Mast. Endemic
Widdringtonia wallichii Endl. ex Carriere, Endemic

See also

References

South African plant biodiversity lists
South Africa